Susan Margery Jeaffreson Lloyd (7 August 1939 – 20 October 2011) was an English model and actress, with numerous film and television credits. She may be best known for her long-running role (1979 to 1985) as Barbara Hunter ( Brady) in the British soap opera Crossroads and Cordelia Winfield in the ITC series The Baron.

Early life
The daughter of a GP, Lloyd was born in Aldeburgh, Suffolk. She attended Edgbaston High School in Birmingham and studied dance as a child, attending Sadler's Wells Ballet School. In 1953, she won a scholarship to the Royal Ballet School at Sadler's Wells Theatre, but when she grew to  her possibilities for a career as a dancer diminished, and she became a showgirl and model, and, briefly, a member of Lionel Blair's dance troupe.

She was one of the last two debutantes to be presented to the queen at Buckingham Palace in 1958; the final such ceremony.

Films and television

In 1965, Lloyd made her film debut in two espionage-themed films. As Jean Courtney, Lloyd proved an effective foil to Michael Caine's Harry Palmer in the spy thriller The Ipcress File.

In 1965, Lloyd played the regular role of secret agent Cordelia Winfield, alongside Steve Forrest in the 1965–1966 British ITC television series The Baron.

Having appeared in the TV series The Avengers (episode "A Surfeit of H2O"), in 1971, Lloyd starred in a stage version of the TV series playing John Steed's sidekick Mrs Hannah Wild. She appeared with several other stars in the 1976 imitation James Bond film No. 1 of the Secret Service.

She made many guest appearances in several popular shows of the 1960s and 1970s, including The Saint, Department S, Jason King, Randall and Hopkirk (Deceased), The Persuaders! and The Sweeney.

Joan Collins and Lloyd co-starred in The Stud and The Bitch. On her Twitter page, Joan Collins said that she and Lloyd had to get drunk before their nude scenes. Her other film credits include Corruption and Revenge of the Pink Panther. She reunited with Michael Caine in Bullet to Beijing (1995), one of the later Harry Palmer films, recreating her role in The Ipcress File. Her scene was cut from the home VHS & DVD releases, but were later made available as DVD Extras.

Lloyd joined the long-running British soap opera Crossroads in 1979. She played Barbara Hunter until she and her on- and off-screen partner Ronald Allen were dropped from the series in 1985.

Personal life
In Crossroads Lloyd played the wife of actor Ronald Allen, who was sacked on the same day she was. They were good friends, having met shortly after his partner, fellow Crossroads actor Brian Hankins, had died from cancer in 1978. In May 1991, Lloyd surprised friends by marrying Allen six weeks before he died from cancer on 18 June.

Sue Lloyd died on 20 October 2011, aged 72, from cancer.

Filmography
Movies
 Nothing but the Best (1964) – Debutante at Hunt Ball (uncredited)
 The Ipcress File (1965) – Jean Courtney
 Hysteria (1965) – French Girl
 Attack on the Iron Coast (1968) – Sue Wilson
 Corruption (1968) – Lynn Nolan
 Where's Jack? (1969) – Lady Darlington
 Twinky (1970) – Ursula – Scott's Deprived Girl
 Percy (1971) – Bernice
 Innocent Bystanders (1972) – Joanna Benson
 Go for a Take (1972) – Angel Montgomery
 Penny Gold (1973) – Model
 Spanish Fly (1975) – Janet Scott
 The Ups and Downs of a Handyman (1976) – The Blonde
 No. 1 of the Secret Service (1977) – Sister Jane
 Revenge of the Pink Panther (1977) – Claude Rousseau
 The Stud (1978) – Vanessa
 Lady Oscar (1979) – Comtesse Gabrielle de Polignac
 The Bitch (1979) – Vanessa Grant
 Correction, Please or How We Got into Pictures (1979) – Countess Skladanowsky
 Rough Cut (1980) – Female Guest
 Eat the Rich (1987) – Val
 U.F.O. (1993) – Judge
 Bullet to Beijing (1995) – Jean Courtney
 Beginner's Luck (2001) – (Last appearance)

Television
 The Saint series 2 ep. 19 "Luella" (1964–1967) – Marla Clayton / Luella
 Gideon's Way (1965) credited as Susan Lloyd– Mary Henderson / Det. Chief Insp. David Keene's love interest
 The Avengers series 4 ep. 8 "A Surfeit of H2O" (1965) – Joyce Jason
 The Baron (1966–1967) – Cordelia Winfield
 The Saint series 5 ep. 22 "Island of Chance" (1967) – Marla Clayton / Luella
 Journey to the Unknown series 1 ep. 7 "The Madison Equation" (1969) – Barbara Rossiter
 Department S ep. "Black Out" (1969) – Brigitte
 The Persuaders! ep. 3 "Take Seven" (1971) – Maggie
 The Two Ronnies (1972) – Blanche
 That's Your Funeral (1972) – Miss Peach
 The Sweeney (1976) – Arleen Baker
 The Upchat Line (1977 - Episode 4 - "The One That Got Away") - Mona Lisa
 Crossroads (1979–1985) – Barbara Hunter / Barbara Brady
 Bergerac (1988–1990) – Eva Southurst
 Agatha Christie's Miss Marple: A Caribbean Mystery (1989) – Lucky Dyson
 Keeping Up Appearances (1993)

References

External links
 

1939 births
2011 deaths
British debutantes
Deaths from cancer in England
English female models
English film actresses
English soap opera actresses
English television actresses
People from Aldeburgh
Place of death missing